Dreams Are Not Enough is the fourth studio album by Telefon Tel Aviv. It was released via Ghostly International on September 27, 2019. It is Joshua Eustis's first album under the Telefon Tel Aviv moniker since the 2009 passing of his bandmate Charles Cooper. Listed top to bottom on the album's front cover, the song titles form a poem.

Critical reception

At Metacritic, which assigns a weighted average score out of 100 to reviews from mainstream critics, the album received an average score of 84, based on 5 reviews, indicating "universal acclaim".

Ryan Keeling of Resident Advisor wrote, "Dreams Are Not Enough is a remarkable return that achieves things the first three Telefon Tel Aviv albums were never quite able to." He added that "the best quality of Dreams Are Not Enough is the fusion of its emotions, as positivity and negativity flow into each other like convergent tributaries of a river." Paul Simpson of AllMusic called the album "An absolutely crushing listen, and every bit as powerful as the previous three TTA albums." Haydon Spenceley of Under the Radar commented that "the record is best enjoyed whole, with headphones, concentration, and responded to with adulation." He said, "Dreams Are Not Enough is 2019's best electronic album, hands down."

Track listing

Personnel
Credits adapted from liner notes.

 Joshua Eustis – performance, production
 Turk Dietrich – additional production (4)
 Deru – additional production (6), guidance (6)
 Rafael Anton Irisarri – mastering
 Molly Smith – art direction, art execution
 Particula Universum – calligraphy

References

External links
 

2019 albums
Telefon Tel Aviv albums
Ghostly International albums
Electronic albums by American artists